Hagen – Ennepe-Ruhr-Kreis I is an electoral constituency (German: Wahlkreis) represented in the Bundestag. It elects one member via first-past-the-post voting. Under the current constituency numbering system, it is designated as constituency 138. It is located in the Ruhr region of North Rhine-Westphalia, comprising the city of Hagen and the southern part of the Ennepe-Ruhr-Kreis district.

Hagen – Ennepe-Ruhr-Kreis I was created for the inaugural 1949 federal election. Since 2021, it has been represented by Timo Schisanowski of the Social Democratic Party (SPD).

Geography
Hagen – Ennepe-Ruhr-Kreis I is located in the Ruhr region of North Rhine-Westphalia. As of the 2021 federal election, it comprises the independent city of Hagen and the municipalities of Breckerfeld, Ennepetal, Gevelsberg, and Schwelm from the Ennepe-Ruhr-Kreis district.

History
Hagen – Ennepe-Ruhr-Kreis I was created in 1949, then known as Hagen. It acquired its current name in the 2002 election. In the 1949 election, it was North Rhine-Westphalia constituency 53 in the numbering system. From 1953 through 1961, it was number 114. From 1965 through 1976, it was number 113. From 1980 through 1998, it was number 108. From 2002 through 2009, it was number 139. Since 2013, it has been number 138.

Originally, the constituency was coterminous with the city of Hagen. It acquired its current borders in the 2002 election.

Members
The constituency has been held by the Social Democratic Party (SPD) during all but three Bundestag terms since its creation. It was first represented by Luise Rehling of the Christian Democratic Union (CDU) from 1949 to 1961. Fritz Steinhoff of the SPD was elected in 1961 and served until 1969, followed by Lothar Wrede until 1983. Hans-Günther Toetemeyer was then representative from 1983 to 1994. Dietmar Thieser served a single term from 1994 to 1998. René Röspel was elected in 1998, and re-elected in 2002, 2005, 2009, 2013, and 2017. He was succeeded by Timo Schisanowski in 2021.

Election results

2021 election

2017 election

2013 election

2009 election

References

Federal electoral districts in North Rhine-Westphalia
1949 establishments in West Germany
Constituencies established in 1949
Hagen
Ennepe-Ruhr-Kreis